Chapel of the Chimes is a 2002 EP by Xiu Xiu.  It features a cover of "Ceremony", originally by Joy Division. The title of the EP is a reference to the Chapel of the Chimes in Oakland, California, located north of San Jose, the band's city of origin.

Track listing
 "I Am the Center of Your World" – 3:00
 "Jennifer Lopez" (The Sweet Science Version) – 2:38
 "Ten-Thousand-Times-a-Minute" – 3:29
 "King Earth, King Earth" – 4:40
 "Ceremony" (Ian Curtis, Bernard Sumner, Peter Hook, Stephen Morris) – 4:29

Personnel
 Jamie Stewart – vocals, piano, programming, guitar, harmonium
 Lauren Andrews – mandolin, guitar, synthesizer, production
 Yvonne Chen – bass, bells, synthesizer
 Cory McCulloch - synthesizer, bass, switchblade, feedback

Additional personnel
 Jherek Bischoff – upright bass
 Korum Bischoff – drums
 Zach Hill – bells, gongs
 Jamie Peterson – snare drum
 Kurt Stumbaugh - baritone sax
 Zack Wentz - drums
 Jorge Tapia - art, layout
 Carl Saff - mastering
 Mira O'Brian - artwork

References

Xiu Xiu albums
2002 EPs